The Irish Presbyterian Mission was an Irish Presbyterian missionary society.

Activities

China
It was involved in sending workers to countries such as China during the late Qing Dynasty.

India
It also sent missionaries to Kathiawar peninsula of Gujarat, India in 1840s.

The Irish Presbyterian Church commissioned Alexander Kerr and James Glasgow in 1840 for missionary work in Gujarat. They arrived in Bombay in 1841 and reached Kathiawar Peninsula. They set up mission offices in Porbandar and Ghogha by 1843. When London Missionary Society closed its mission in Surat in 1847, the IP mission took over the church. It restarted it work in Ahmedabad in 1863. The mission established the first Christian village in Gujarat, Khashivadi near Borsad, in 1847. It also established a Robert's Hospital in Borsad in 1859. It founded other Christian villages; Ranipur near Ahmedabad (1862), Wallacepur, Khadana near Borsad, Porda, Anand, Brookhill and Nadiad. It also established the first 'ony girls' school at Muglisara, Surat in 1876. The first theological training course was set up in 1864 in Ahmedabad. In 1892, Fleming Stevenson Divinity College opened under the guidance of G. P. Taylor. In 1948, the administration was taken over by Gujarat Church Council (Presbytery) and later by Gujarat Christian Society by 1969.

See also
Protestant missionary societies in China during the 19th Century
Timeline of Chinese history
19th-century Protestant missions in China
List of Protestant missionaries in China
Christianity in China
I P Mission School

References

Further reading
 

Presbyterian missionary societies
Christian missions in China
Presbyterian Church in Ireland
Christian missions in India